1st Mokva or Pervaya Mokva is a rural locality and the administrative center of Mokovsky Selsoviet Rural Settlement, Kursky District, Kursk Oblast, Russia. Population:

Geography 
The village is located on the Mokva River (a right tributary of the Seym River basin), 85 km from the Russia–Ukraine border, on the western border of the district center – the town Kursk (10 km west of it by road). Mokva is the nearest rural locality.

 Streets
There are the following streets in the village: Baklashovka, Veselaya, Vesennaya, Gorodskaya, Druzhnaya, Zagorodnaya, Zarechnaya, Zelenaya, Kozhevennaya, Koltsevaya, Kurskaya, Lesnaya, Luchistaya, Mayskaya, Malinovaya, Mokovskaya, Nelidova Pereulok, Nelidova, Orekhovaya, Parkovaya, Peschanaya, Pochtovaya, Priluzhnaya, Progonnaya, Ryabinovaya, Sadovaya, Sanatornaya, Svobodnaya, Slavyanskaya, Sosnovskaya, Tenistyy Pereulok, Troickaya, Centralnaya, Centralnyн 1st Pereulok, Shkolnaya, Svetlaya, Svetlyj Pereulok, Dubravnaya, Olhovaya, Bagryanaya, Malaya Polyanka and Parkovy Pereulok (859 houses).

 Climate
1st Mokva has a warm-summer humid continental climate (Dfb in the Köppen climate classification).

Transport 
1st Mokva is located on the federal route  Crimea Highway (a part of the European route ), 8 km from the nearest railway station Ryshkovo (railway line Lgov I — Kursk).

The rural locality is situated 14 km from Kursk Vostochny Airport, 122 km from Belgorod International Airport and 217 km from Voronezh Peter the Great Airport.

References

Notes

Sources

Rural localities in Kursky District, Kursk Oblast